E3 ubiquitin-protein ligase RING1 is an enzyme that in humans is encoded by the RING1 gene.

Function 

This gene belongs to the RING finger family, members of which encode proteins characterized by a RING domain, a zinc-binding motif related to the zinc finger domain. The gene product can bind DNA and can act as a transcriptional repressor. It is associated with the multimeric polycomb group protein complex. The gene product interacts with the polycomb group proteins BMI1, EDR1, and CBX4, and colocalizes with these proteins in large nuclear domains. It interacts with the CBX4 protein via its glycine-rich C-terminal domain. The gene maps to the HLA class II region, where it is contiguous with the RING finger genes FABGL and HKE4.

Interactions 

RING1 has been shown to interact with CBX8, BMI1 and RYBP.

References

Further reading

External links 
 

Transcription factors